30 Greatest Hits is a 2007 compilation released by the Red Elvises.

Track listing 

Disc One

I Wanna See You Bellydance
Closet Disco Dancer
Gypsy Heart
Love Rocket
Rocketman
Sex In Paradise
Boogie On The Beach
Million Miles
Venice USA
All I Wanna Do
200 lb Of Pure Love
Winter Reggae
Everybody Disco
Kegga Beer
Memoirs of a Phuket Geisha

Disc Two

Hanky Panky Kind Of Love
Don't Stop The Dance
200 Flying Girls
Siberia
Jerry's Got A Squeezebox
Harriett
Sad Cowboy Song
My Love Is Killing Me
My Darling Lorraine
Strip Joint Is Closed
Ticket To Japan
I'm Not That Kind Of Guy
Juliet
Tango
Good Guys

References

All pages needing factual verification
Red Elvises albums
2006 greatest hits albums